The Young-Burgess classification is a system of categorizing pelvic fractures based on fracture pattern, allowing judgment on the stability of the pelvic ring.

Classification

See also
Tile classification

References

Pelvic fracture classifications
Injuries of abdomen, lower back, lumbar spine and pelvis